The 1963 Drexel Dragons football team represented the Drexel Institute of Technology (renamed Drexel University in 1970) as a member of the Middle Atlantic Conference during the 1963 NCAA College Division football season. Tom Grebis was the team's head coach.

The 1963 season was the first season the football team played at the new Drexel Field (later renamed Vitas Field), located at 43rd and Powelton in Philadelphia, Pennsylvania.

Schedule

Roster

References

Drexel
Drexel Dragons football seasons
Drexel Dragons football